"Love Is Alive" is a song written by Kent Robbins, and recorded by American country music duo The Judds.  It released May 1985 as the third single from the album Why Not Me.  The song was The Judds fourth number one country hit.  The single spent one week at number one and spent a total of 14 weeks on the chart.

Charts

Weekly charts

Year-end charts

References

1985 singles
1984 songs
The Judds songs
Songs written by Kent Robbins
Song recordings produced by Brent Maher
RCA Records singles
Curb Records singles